Jean Despeaux (22 October 1915 – 25 May 1989) was a French boxer who competed in the 1936 Summer Olympics.

In 1936 he won the gold medal in the middleweight class after winning the final against Henry Tiller.

He also acted in a handful of films, including Maurice Tourneur's La Main du diable (1943), in which he played a boxer.

1936 Olympic results
Below is the Olympic record of Jean Despeaux of France, who competed as a middleweight boxer at the 1936 Berlin Olympics.

 Round of 16: defeated Juan Bregaliano (Uruguay) on points
 Quarterfinal: defeated Josef Hrubes (Czechoslovakia) on points
 Semifinal: defeated Raul Villarreal (Argentina) on points
 Final: defeated Henry Tiller (Norway) on points (won gold medal)

References
 profile

1915 births
1989 deaths
Middleweight boxers
Olympic boxers of France
Boxers at the 1936 Summer Olympics
Olympic gold medalists for France
Olympic medalists in boxing
French male boxers
Medalists at the 1936 Summer Olympics